"Burning Daylight" is a song by Dutch singers Mia Nicolai and Dion Cooper, released on 1 March 2023. The song is set to represent the Netherlands in the Eurovision Song Contest 2023 after the artists were internally selected by AVROTROS, the Dutch broadcaster for the Eurovision Song Contest.

Eurovision Song Contest

Internal selection 
A submission period was opened by the broadcaster on 17 May 2022 where artists and composers were able to submit their entries until 31 August 2022. Each artist and songwriter was able to submit a maximum of three songs, which were judged by a selection commission consisting of AVROTROS general director Eric van Stade, television presenter and author Cornald Maas, singer and television presenter Jan Smit, radio DJs Hila Noorzai, Carolien Borgers and Sander Lantinga.

AVROTROS announced Mia Nicolai and Dion Cooper as the Dutch entrants on 1 November 2022. On 22 February 2023, the duo would announce that their song for the Eurovision Song Contest 2023 would be released on 1 March. Six days later, the duo announced their title of the song as "Burning Daylight".

At Eurovision 
According to Eurovision rules, all nations with the exceptions of the host country and the "Big Five" (France, Germany, Italy, Spain and the United Kingdom) are required to qualify from one of two semi-finals in order to compete for the final; the top ten countries from each semi-final progress to the final. The European Broadcasting Union (EBU) split up the competing countries into six different pots based on voting patterns from previous contests, with countries with favourable voting histories put into the same pot. On 31 January 2023, an allocation draw was held, which placed each country into one of the two semi-finals, and determined which half of the show they would perform in. The Netherlands has been placed into the first semi-final, to be held on 9 May 2023, and has been scheduled to perform in the second half of the show.

Charts

References 

2023 songs
2023 singles
Eurovision songs of 2023
Eurovision songs of the Netherlands